The Internet Philosophy Ontology Project (InPhO ) is a project of Indiana University's Cognitive Science Program funded by a grant from the National Endowment for the Humanities. It is an attempt to create a model of the discipline of philosophy as an online resource. The website makes it possible to search and navigate via relations among philosophical ideas, scholars and works.

References

External links 

  of InPhO

Philosophical literature
Indiana University
Ontology (information science)